Sir John Buckworth, 2nd Baronet  (1704–1759), of Rathbone Place, London, and West Sheen, Surrey, was a British politician who sat in the House of Commons from 1734 to 1741.

Buckworth was baptized on 5 April 1704, the eldest son  of Sir John Buckworth, 1st Baronet,  Sheriff of London, and his wife  Elizabeth Hall, daughter of John Hall of Yarmouth, Norfolk. He succeeded his father in the baronetcy on 12 June 1709. He was educated at   Eton College in about 1716 and joined the army. In 1718 he was a lieutenant and captain in the 1st Foot Guards but was out of the army by 1727.
 
Buckworth stood for Parliament at  Heytesbury  in 1722 but was defeated,  He was returned as Member of Parliament for Weobley at the  1734 British general election, His votes were against the Government. He did not stand at the 1741 British general election, but tried again at Weobley in 1747 and was defeated.

Buckworth married after 1741, Mary Jane Clermont, sister of Angelique Faicho Clermont. He died on 31 December  1758 at Rathbone Place and was buried in Eton College Chapel. He had no legitimate issue but in his will refers to sons Charles Buckworth a lieutenant in the Fusiliers, and Francis a Royal Navy officer. A daughter Frances Mary, was the wife of Nathaniel Gould. He was succeeded in the baronetcy by his brother Everard.

References

1704 births
1759 deaths
People educated at Eton College
British MPs 1734–1741
Members of the Parliament of Great Britain for English constituencies
Baronets in the Baronetage of England